Roderick Charles Young (born 1966) is a United States district judge of the United States District Court for the Eastern District of Virginia and former United States magistrate judge of the same court.

Education 

Young earned his Bachelor of Arts and Master of Arts from George Mason University, and his Juris Doctor from the West Virginia University College of Law.

Legal and academic career 

After admission to the Virginia bar, he became an Assistant Public Defender for the Portsmouth, Virginia Public Defender's Office. He then spent four years as a prosecutor in Richmond, Virginia, eventually becoming a Senior Assistant Commonwealth's Attorney. Young then served for twelve years as an Assistant United States Attorney for the Eastern District of Virginia, rising to become the Deputy Criminal Supervisor.

Federal judicial service 

Young served as a United States magistrate judge of the United States District Court for the Eastern District of Virginia, a position he was appointed to on October 28, 2014, and left in 2020 upon becoming a district judge. 

On March 20, 2020, Young's name along with fellow Magistrate Judge Douglas Miller was recommended by Virginia Senators Tim Kaine and Mark Warner to the White House. On May 6, 2020, President Donald Trump announced his intent to nominate Young to serve as a United States district judge for the United States District Court for the Eastern District of Virginia. On May 21, 2020, his nomination was sent to the United States Senate. He has been nominated to the seat vacated by Judge Rebecca Beach Smith who assumed senior status on August 1, 2019. A hearing on his nomination before the Senate Judiciary Committee was held on June 24, 2020. On July 30, 2020, his nomination was reported out of committee by a 22–0 vote. On September 23, 2020, the United States Senate invoked cloture on his nomination by a 93–3 vote. On September 24, 2020, his nomination was confirmed by a 93–2 vote. He received his judicial commission on September 29, 2020.

See also 
 List of African-American federal judges
 List of African-American jurists

References

External links 
 

1966 births
Living people
20th-century American lawyers
21st-century American lawyers
21st-century American judges
African-American lawyers
African-American judges
Assistant United States Attorneys
College of William & Mary faculty
George Mason University alumni
Judges of the United States District Court for the Eastern District of Virginia
People from Petersburg, Virginia
Public defenders
United States magistrate judges
United States district court judges appointed by Donald Trump
Virginia lawyers
West Virginia University College of Law alumni